Cote or COTE may refer to:

Architecture
Dovecote, a building for pigeons or doves.

People
Cote (surname)
Cote de Pablo, television actress
Cote First Nation

Businesses
Cote (restaurant), Korean steakhouse in New York City
Côte, British restaurant chain

Geographic names
Rural Municipality of Cote No. 271, Saskatchewan, Canada
Cote, Oxfordshire, England
Cote, Somerset, England, part of the parish of East Huntspill
Cote, West Sussex, England, part of the Borough of Worthing
Cote Blanche, a place in St. Mary parish, Louisiana
Côtes-d'Armor, French department
Côte d'Azur, part of the French Mediterranean coastline
Côte-des-Neiges, a neighbourhood of Montreal, Quebec, Canada
Côte d'Ivoire, a country in West Africa
Côte-d'Or, French department
Côte Saint-Luc, Canadian municipality in Quebec
Côte Vermeille, part of the French Mediterranean coastline, near the border with Spain
Grande Côte, a stretch of coastline in Senegal
Lake Cote, largest natural lake in Costa Rica
Petite Côte, a stretch of coastline in Senegal
Plaza Côte-des-Neiges, a mall in Montreal, Quebec, Canada

Charitable organisation
Children On The Edge, a charity that helps marginalized and vulnerable children

Arts, entertainment, and media
Classroom of the Elite, a light novel series written by Shōgo Kinugasa that was later adapted into a manga and anime
Choir of the Earth, a virtual choir

See also
Côté
Coate (disambiguation)
Coefficients of Thermal Expansion (COTE) for various materials
Cotes (disambiguation)